Bolbitis heteroclita is an aquatic fern species of Bolbitis, native to the Indochina region of tropical Southeast Asia.

Cultivation
Bolbitis heteroclita is   cultivated as an ornamental plant for aquariums and garden ponds. It is one of two species of Bolbitis that are popular for use as freshwater aquarium plants. However, it is exacting to grow this or Bolbitis heudelotii as fully submersed plants. These plants are very sensitive.

This species, however, is easy to grow as a terrestrial or immersed (in ponds) potted plant. It is remarkable for the resemblance of the fronds of a certain size to poison ivy leaves. Some plant nurseries and growers sell this under the rejected former name Bolbitis asiatica.

References

External links 

heteroclita
Ferns of Asia
Flora of Indo-China
Flora of Malesia
Garden plants of Asia
Freshwater plants